Inferno is a 1980 Italian supernatural horror film written and directed by Dario Argento, and starring Irene Miracle, Leigh McCloskey, Eleonora Giorgi, Daria Nicolodi and Alida Valli. The plot follows a young man's investigation into the disappearance of his sister, who had been living in a New York City apartment building that also served as a home for a powerful, centuries-old witch. The cinematography was by Romano Albani, and Keith Emerson composed the film's musical score.

A thematic sequel to Suspiria (1977), the film is the second installment of Argento's Three Mothers trilogy, though it is the first in the trilogy to explore the idea of the Three Mothers. The long-delayed concluding entry, The Mother of Tears, was released in 2007. All three films are partially derived from Thomas de Quincey's 1845 work Suspiria de Profundis, a collection of prose poetry in which he proposes the concept of three "Ladies of Sorrow" (Mater Lachrymarum, Mater Suspiriorum and Mater Tenebrarum), concurrent with the three Fates and Graces in Greek mythology.

Unlike Suspiria, Inferno received a very limited theatrical release, thus unable to match the box office success of its predecessor. While initial critical response was mostly negative, its reputation has improved considerably over the years. Kim Newman has called it "perhaps the most underrated horror movie of the 1980s." In 2005, the magazine Total Film named Inferno one of the 50 greatest horror films of all time.

Plot 
Rose Elliot, a poet living alone in New York City's Upper West Side, purchases a book from an antiques dealer, titled The Three Mothers. The book, written by an alchemist named Varelli, tells of three evil sisters who rule the world with sorrow, tears, and darkness, and dwell inside separate homes that had been built for them by the alchemist. Mater Suspiriorum, the Mother of Sighs, lives in Freiburg. Mater Lachrymarum, the Mother of Tears, lives in Rome, and Mater Tenebrarum, the Mother of Darkness, lives in New York. Rose suspects that she is living in Mater Tenebrarum's building, and writes to her brother Mark, a music student in Rome, urging him to visit her. Using the clues provided in the book, Rose searches the cellar of her building and discovers a hole in the floor which leads to a water-filled ballroom. She accidentally drops her keys and enters the water to find them. After she reclaims the keys, a putrid corpse rises from the depths, frightening her. Rose manages to swim out and flee.

In Rome, Mark attempts to read Rose's letter during class. He is distracted by the intense gaze of a beautiful student, who leaves suddenly; Mark follows, leaving the letter behind. His friend Sara picks up the letter, and later reads it. Horrified by the letter's contents, she takes a taxi to a library and finds a copy of The Three Mothers. Trying to find her way out, Sara becomes lost in the library basement and finds a room filled with boiling cauldrons. Sara is attacked there by a monstrous figure who recognizes the book. She throws the book to the ground and escapes.

Returning to her home, she phones Mark telling him to come and asks a neighbour, Carlo, to keep her company. The lights go out and both Sara and Carlo are stabbed to death by a gloved killer. Mark discovers the bodies and two torn fragments from Rose's letter. After the police arrive, he walks out of Sara's apartment and sees a taxi slowly driving by. In the back seat of the vehicle is the music student, staring at him intently. Mark telephones Rose and promises to visit, but the phone call is cut short. Rose sees two shadowy figures preparing to enter her apartment. She leaves through a back door, but is followed. Running into a decrepit laboratory, she is grabbed by a clawed assailant and guillotined with the glass of a broken window.

Arriving in New York, Mark goes straight to Rose's building, where he meets Carol, the concierge, and some of the residents, including a nurse who cares for elderly Professor Arnold, a wheelchair user who cannot speak. Mark encounters the sickly Countess Elise De Longvalle Adler, who tells him that Rose has disappeared. After the two find blood on the carpet outside Rose's room, Mark follows the stains. Inhaling a strange odour, he becomes ill and falls unconscious. Elise sees a black-robed figure dragging Mark away, but the figure stops and gives chase to Elise. The figure eventually finds her swarmed with rabid cats in a room and stabs her to death. Mark staggers to the apartment building's lobby where Carol and the nurse put him to bed.

The following morning, Mark asks Kazanian, the antique dealer who sold Rose The Three Mothers, about his sister's whereabouts. However, the man provides no information. That night, Kazanian drowns several cats in a Central Park pond and falls into the water. Hundreds of rats from a nearby drain crawl over him, gnawing his flesh. A hot dog vendor hears Kazanian's cries for help and rushes over, but proceeds to kill him with a knife.

More strange deaths occur in the building, when Carol and Elise's butler, John, plots to take advantage of the Countess' death by stealing her valuables. A shocked Carol finds John's corpse in Elise's apartment, and drops a lit candle which starts a fire. Attempting to put out the flames, she becomes entangled in burning draperies and falls from a window to her death.

Mark uses the final clue from Rose's letter to discover that beneath each floor is a secret crawl space. He follows hidden passages to a suite of rooms where he finds Professor Arnold who reveals, via an electronic voice generator, that he is in fact Varelli. He tries to kill Mark with a hypodermic injection. During the struggle, Varelli's neck is caught in his vocal apparatus, choking him. Mark frees him, only to be told that he is still being watched as Varelli dies. Mark follows a shadowy figure to a lavishly furnished chamber, where he finds Varelli's nurse. Laughing maniacally, she reveals to him that she is Mater Tenebrarum. She vanishes, but re-emerges through a mirror as Death personified. However, the fire that has consumed much of the building enables Mark to escape from the witch's den. Debris crashes down on the fiend, destroying her.

Cast

Production 
In 1977, Suspiria had been an unexpectedly big box office hit for 20th Century Fox, released in the U.S. under their "International Classics" banner. Capitalizing on the commercial success of the film, Argento and Daria Nicolodi, who had co-written the screenplay, announced that Suspiria was only the first of a proposed trilogy which they referred to as "The Three Mothers" trilogy. The basic concept of all three films is derived from Thomas de Quincey's Suspiria de Profundis, a sequel to his Confessions of an English Opium-Eater. A prose poem of the book entitled "Levana and Our Ladies of Sorrow", details how, just as there are three Fates and three Graces, there are also three Sorrows: Mater Lachrymarum (The Lady of Tears), Mater Suspiriorum (The Lady of Sighs) and Mater Tenebrarum (The Lady of Darkness). As the title suggests, Suspiria focused on Mater Suspiriorum; the evil sister featured in Inferno is Mater Tenebrarum. The concluding chapter of Argento's trilogy, The Mother of Tears (2007), is about Mater Lachrymarum.

When Argento proposed Inferno as his follow-up to Suspiria, 20th Century Fox agreed to co-finance the production. The film was budgeted at USD $3,000,000, and producer Claudio Argento secured additional co-production money from Italian and German consortia.

Nicolodi devised the original story concept but received no on-screen credit for her work on the screenplay. Nicolodi explained that she did not seek credit because "having fought so hard to see my humble but excellent work in Suspiria recognized (up until a few days before the première I didn't know if I would see my name in the film credits), I didn't want to live through that again, so I said, 'Do as you please, in any case, the story will talk for me because I wrote it.'" Working from Nicolodi's original story notes, Argento wrote the screenplay while staying in a New York hotel room with a view of Central Park.

Filming 
The filming of Inferno took place mainly on interior studio sets in Rome, but a short amount of time was also set aside for location shooting in New York, including Central Park. Sacha Pitoëff's death scene was filmed on location in Central Park during the summer of 1979. William Lustig, who was credited as the film's Production Coordinator, recalled:

During the film's production, Argento became stricken with a severe case of hepatitis---and had to direct some sequences while lying on his back. At one point, the illness became so painful that he was bedridden for a few days; filming was then restricted to second unit work, some of which was done by Mario Bava. Argento has called Inferno one of his least favorite of all his films, as his memories of the movie are tainted by his recollection of the painful illness he suffered.

Design and effects 
Argento invited his mentor, Mario Bava, to provide some of the optical effects, matte paintings and trick shots for the film. Some of the cityscape views seen in Inferno were actually tabletop skyscrapers built by Bava out of milk cartons covered with photographs. The apartment building that Rose lived in was in fact only a partial set built in the studio—it was a few floors high and had to be visually augmented with a small sculpture constructed by Bava. This sculpture was set aflame toward the end of production and served as the burning building seen in the climax.

Bava also provided some second unit direction for the production. Maitland McDonagh has suggested that Bava had his hand in the celebrated watery ballroom scene, but that sequence was shot in a water tank by Gianlorenzo Battaglia, without any optical effects work at all. Bava's son, Lamberto Bava, was the film's assistant director.

The film's fiery final sequence was shot without a stunt performer filling in for Leigh McCloskey. After the production's principal photography had been completed, the film's producer, Claudio Argento, asked if McCloskey would be willing to perform the stuntwork himself, as the stuntman hired for the job had broken his leg. The producer assured the actor: "It'll be absolutely safe". The actor agreed, and when he walked onto the set the following day he observed "three rows of plexiglass in front of everything and everyone is wearing hard hats. I'm the only guy standing on the other side of this!... Needless to say, I did it all on instinct... I still feel that blast of the door blowing by me. When they tell you in words, its one thing, but when you feel that glass go flying past you with a sound like a Harrier jet, you never forget it!"

Music 

Dario Argento chose progressive rocker Keith Emerson to compose Infernos soundtrack because he "wanted a different sort of score [from that by Italian prog group Goblin on Suspiria], a more delicate one".

Argento prominently featured a selection from Giuseppe Verdi's Nabucco throughout Inferno, the Chorus of the Hebrew Slaves ("Va, pensiero, sull'ali dorate"), an operatic chestnut, from scene two of the opera's third act. In two instances, a recording of the Sinphonic [sic] Orchestra and Chorus of Rome was used. Argento also tasked Emerson with including the piece in his soundtrack. He re-orchestrated "Va, pensiero..." in five-four time to mimic a "fast and bumpy" taxi ride through Rome. When Argento reviewed Emerson's progress he did not initially recognize the remix, but was later pleased to discover it was used for Sara's taxi ride.

A soundtrack album was originally released as an LP in 1980 on Atlantic Records (K 50753), and by the Cinevox label in 1981. In 2000, Cinevox released an expanded version of the album on CD. In 2018, Waxwork Records released the complete soundtrack on a double LP.

Emerson's music met with a mixed response from critics, some of whom compared it unfavorably to Goblin's score for Suspiria. Time Outs Scott Meek noted that "Argento's own over-the-top score [for Suspiria] has been replaced by religioso thunderings from the keyboards of Keith Emerson". A review of the 2000 Cinevox CD by AllMusic notes, "The keyboard selections are rather unremarkable, except for the finale, "Cigarettes, Ice, Etc.", on which Emerson uses his full keyboard arsenal to excellent effect."

Release 
Inferno was distributed in Italy by 20th Century Fox on February 8, 1980. The film grossed a total of 1,331,763,000 Italian lire domestically (around $1.6 million at the time). The film had initially promising box office with the films premier in Rome had 500 tickets returned as the venue was packed with audiences even sitting on the floor of the theatre. Overall the film was the 14th highest grossing film in Italy in 1980 and eighth among the highest grossing films of the year.

For reasons never specified, Fox did not commit to a wide theatrical release of Inferno in the United States. In an interview with Maitland McDonagh, Argento speculated that Fox's decision was made due to an abrupt change in management at the studio that left Inferno and several dozen other films in limbo as a result of them having been greenlighted by the previous management. The movie sat on the shelf for five years and was released straight to VHS in 1985 via the studio's Key Video subsidiary. The following year, it had a belated theatrical release by Fox, playing for a one-week engagement in a New York City movie theatre. Worldwide, the film only had a very abbreviated and minimal theatrical release. As noted by Argento, "I think anybody outside of Italy was lucky to see Inferno." Consequently, Inferno was not a commercial success.

Critical response
Initial critical response was fairly muted. Several reviewers expressed disappointment, comparing the film unfavorably to the much more bombastic Suspiria. In a review that was later reprinted in McDonagh's critically acclaimed Broken Mirrors/Broken Minds: The Dark Dreams of Dario Argento (1994), Variety said Inferno was a "lavish, no-holds-barred witch story whose lack of both logic and technical skill are submerged in the sheer energy of the telling", then complained that the film "fails mainly because it lacks restraint in setting up the terrifying moment, using close-ups and fancy camera angles gratuitously and with no relevance to the story." Reviewing the film during its brief theatrical release in 1986, Nina Darnton of The New York Times noted, "The movie's distinguishing feature is not the number or variety of horrible murders, but the length of time it takes for the victims to die. This is a technique that may have been borrowed from Italian opera, but without the music, it loses some of its panache. The film... is shot in vivid colors, at some striking angles, and the background music is Verdi rather than heavy metal. But the script and acting are largely routine." However, Cinefantastique described the film as "the stuff of all our worst dreams and nightmares and a tour de force from Italian director Dario Argento... Inferno brings his personal redefinition of the genre close to perfection."

Inferno continues to have a mixed critical reputation. The film has a 64% favorable rating on film review aggregator website Rotten Tomatoes based on 14 reviews. Metacritic assigned the film a score of 69 out of 100 based on 8 critic reviews, indicating "generally favorable reviews".  Leonard Maltin's Movie Guide gave the film two and a half stars and opined it was a "surreal, hypnotic shocker... short on sense, but long on style."  But several critics have praised the film. Upon its initial release on videotape, Tim Lucas in The Video Watchdog Book said, "The movie is terrific, much more exciting than most contemporary horror video releases..." Kim Newman, in The Penguin Encyclopedia of Horror and the Supernatural, noted that Inferno was "a dazzling series of set pieces designed to give the impression that the real world is terrifying, beautiful, erotic and dangerous... Inferno is a masterpiece of absolute film, and perhaps the most underrated horror movie of the 1980s."  In 2013, Time Out compiled a list of the 100 greatest horror films ever made based on the top ten lists of over one hundred film directors, screenwriters, and critics, and Inferno was listed as No. 92; in the resulting critical commentary for the film, Nigel Floyd wrote, "Horror cinema at its most baroque: a simple libretto is embroidered with elaborate, flowing camera movements, abstract blocks of colour, unsettling sound effects and soundtrack composer Keith Emerson’s thunderous rock variations on Verdi... Argento’s best work is far behind him, but this alone justifies his cult reputation."

References

Footnotes

Sources

External links 
 

1980 films
1980 horror films
1980s supernatural horror films
Films about witchcraft
Films directed by Dario Argento
Films scored by Keith Emerson
Films set in apartment buildings
Films set in Manhattan
Films set in Rome
Films shot in New York City
Films shot in Rome
Films with screenplays by Dario Argento
Italian sequel films
Italian supernatural horror films
1980s Italian-language films
1980s Italian films